Weyrauchia aeruginosa is a species of beetle in the family Cerambycidae. It was described by Monne in 2004.

References

Trachyderini
Beetles described in 2004